Mudit Nayar is an Indian television actor.

Personal life
Mudit was born in Allahabad

Career
Mudit made his television début with Palampur Express as Tanmay Bose. Then he played the role of Keshav in Teri Meri Love Stories.
Then he bagged the lead role of Jeet in popular horror television serial Anamika opposite Simran Kaur, Annie Gill and Shivani Surve which was his first major break. He was nominated at the ITA Awards that year for the same. His next project was ‘Badi Devrani’ in which he portrayed the character of Vibhor Poddar. He next went on to play the role of Vardhan in Devanshi. Currently he is portraying the role of Yogi in Sony TV 's Ishaaron Ishaaron Mein. For his performance he won ITA Award for Best Actor (Jury). He won the Lions Gold Best Actor Award for the same.

Television

References

External links

1987 births
Living people
Indian male film actors
Indian male television actors